Russia women's national floorball team is the national team of Russia. At the 1997 Floorball Women's World Championship in Godby and Mariehamn, Åland, Finland, the team finished fifth. At the 1999 Floorball Women's World Championship in Borlänge, Sweden, the team withdrew from the competition and were relegated to the B-Division. At the 2001 Floorball Women's World Championship in Riga, Latvia, the team finished first in the B-Division and were elevated to the A-Division. At the 2003 Floorball Women's World Championship in Germany, the team finished fifth in the A-Division. At the 2005 Floorball Women's World Championship in Singapore, the team finished sixth in the A-Division. At the 2007 Floorball Women's World Championship in Frederikshavn, Denmark, the team finished seventh in the A-Division. At the 2013 Floorball Women's World Championship in Brno and Ostrava, Czech Republic, the team finished tenth.

References 

Women's national floorball teams
Floorball